Road pizza can refer to:
Roadkill
Apple Video codec, character code RPZA, introduced in early versions of QuickTime